Winterswijk (also known as Winterswiek or Wenters) is a municipality and a town in the eastern Netherlands.

It was also known as Winethereswick, Winriswic or Wenterswic; the Anglo Saxon wich or wic means the living place of a certain person. The person would likely have been called Wenether, Winitar or Winter.

Geography
Winterswijk is located in east of the province of Gelderland in the east of the Netherlands. It is part of the region of Achterhoek.

History

Founded around 1000 AD it remained an isolated farming community until 1830 when the road from Borken to Zutphen via Winterswijk and Groenlo was built. Around 1840 many emigrated to America — Michigan in particular. After 1870 the town became a centre for textiles, such as spinning and weaving and indeed the Tricot fabriek employed a large proportion of the local population in its heyday. In 1878 the railway line to Zutphen was built primarily for the textile industry, which was set up by Jan Willink. Some of the families such as the Willinks have lived there since 1284.

World War II and Liberation

On 31 March, 1945 was the liberation day for Winterswijk during World War II. Before the city was liberated, there was a tank battle on the 30th of March in one of the townships called Woold, with sixty Sherman tanks. The 53rd Welsh Division and the 3rd British Infantry Division, were moving from Bocholt via Aalten to Winterswijk. The tank battle resulted in sixteen German and nine British soldiers losing their lives. On 31 March, 1945 (Good Friday) around nine o'clock in the evening allied forces had a struggle just over five km south of Winterswijk following reinforcements from the NSB. On 31 March the first allied troops finally reached the Slingestream near Winterswijk. 31 March is marked as the official day to remember the liberation of Winterswijk, despite the fact that in the late afternoon of 31 March parts of Miste and Woold were already liberated. After the liberation of Winterswijk they founded a Rest-Centre for British soldiers in the Sociëteit de Eendracht (Zonnebrink), where the British soldiers, who came from the front, could find some rest. The British front was moving in April 1945, in the northwest of Germany.  

Although the Jewish community of Winterswijk was greatly decimated during the war, a synagogue still exists. Yet no regular services are being held. The synagogue is open for visitors and guided tours.

Railway stations
 Winterswijk
 Winterswijk West

Notable residents

 John H. Corscot (1839–1926), mayor of Madison, Wisconsin, 1893 to 1895
 Piet Mondriaan (1872–1944), painter, pioneer of 20th century abstract art, lived in Winterswijk ages 8-20
 Willem van Otterloo (1907–1978), conductor, cellist, composer
 Max van Dam (1910–1943) artist, murdered in the Sobibor extermination camp
 Johanna Reiss (born 1932), Dutch-American writer, longtime resident of New York City
 Bram Stemerdink (born 1936), politician, Minister of Defence 1976/77
 Gerrit Komrij (1944-2012) poet, novelist, critic, journalist and playwright
 Dick Mol (born 1955) paleontologist and specialist in the field of mammoths
 Johan Houwers (born 1957) politician, real estate broker and convicted mortgage fraudster
 Herman Brock Jr. (born 1970) left-handed Dutch bluegrass, Americana and Blues musician
 Fleur Dorland (born 2005) Dutch singer

Sport 

 Willy Hillen (born 1943) former sports shooter, competed at the 1972 and 1976 Summer Olympics
 Jan Vreman (born 1965), football manager and former player for De Graafschap
 Martijn Meerdink (born 1976), football player
 Jurgen Wevers (born 1979), football goalkeeper
 Myrthe Schoot (born 1988) volleyball player, competed at the 2016 Summer Olympics
 Stef Dusseldorp (born 1989), racing driver

Gallery

References

External links

 
Municipalities of Gelderland
Populated places in Gelderland
Cities in the Netherlands
Achterhoek